Plaza Miserere (officially Plaza de Miserere) is a station on Line A of the Buenos Aires Underground. The station is located between Alberti and Loria / Pasco stations on the A line underground.
Plaza Miserere has interchange with Once underground station of the H line and connection to the Sarmiento line commuter rail service within Once railway station, the central station of the Domingo Faustino Sarmiento Railway.

Overview
It is located at the intersection of Rivadavia and Pueyrredón avenues, under the popular Plaza Miserere, in the neighborhood of Balvanera. The station zone is a shopping precinct and in its vicinity are the French Hospital and the Once railway station of the Sarmiento Railway. This station belonged to the first section of Line A opened on 1 December 1913, linking this station and the Plaza de Mayo station. On 1 April 1914 the line was extended to Río de Janeiro.

In 1997 the station was declared a national historic monument.

History
When the Anglo-Argentine Tramways Company (Compañía de Tranvías Anglo-Argentina, in Spanish) inaugurated on 1 December 1913 its Line 1 (Today, Line A of the subway), Plaza Once—today Miserere—was the terminus, and thanks to an agreement with the company's Buenos Aires Western Railway (Ferrocarril Oeste de Buenos Aires, in Spanish)—Sarmiento today—it was possible the design and construction of the subway station with the possibility of being used in a synchronized manner for both modes of transport. To do this, it was built with 6 tracks (4 for the subway and 2 for the train) and 4 platforms (2 lateral and two central).

References

External links

Buenos Aires Underground stations
Balvanera
Railway stations opened in 1913
1913 establishments in Argentina
National Historic Monuments of Argentina